Anne Nelson (born 1954) is an American journalist, author, playwright, and professor.

Early life and education
Anne Nelson was born in Fort Sill, Oklahoma in 1954, and spent her childhood in Lincoln, Nebraska. She graduated from Yale University in 1976.

Career
From 1980 to 1983, Nelson served as a war correspondent in El Salvador and Guatemala.

In 2005, she received a Guggenheim Fellowship in Nonfiction and German and East European History for her research for the book Red Orchestra.

Nelson teaches at the School of International and Public Affairs at Columbia University.

Nelson's 2021 book "How Powerful Is This Right-Wing Shadow Network?" deals with the political influence of groups including the right wing Council for National Policy. She was led to investigate the group after listening to reporters on talk radio while driving about what was "really happening". She discovered that irrationally the news in Oklahoma was not the same news that she was involved with in New York.

Bibliography
 Murder Under Two Flags: The US, Puerto Rico, and the Cerro Maravilla Cover-up; New York : Ticknor & Fields, 1986. 
 The Guys: A Play. New York : Random House, 2002. 
 Red Orchestra: The Story of the Berlin Underground and the Circle of Friends Who Resisted Hitler. New York: Random House, 2009.  
 Suzanne's Children New York : Simon & Schuster, 2017. 
 Shadow Network: Media, Money, and the Secret Hub of the Radical Right, New York : Bloomsbury Publishing, 2019.

References

External links

 
 
  
 Anne Nelson-Black Papers (MS 1444). Manuscripts and Archives, Yale University Library.

1954 births
Living people
American women dramatists and playwrights
American women journalists
American women war correspondents
Journalists from Oklahoma
Yale University alumni
Columbia University faculty
20th-century American journalists
20th-century American women writers
20th-century American dramatists and playwrights
21st-century American women writers
21st-century American dramatists and playwrights
21st-century American non-fiction writers
American women non-fiction writers
People from Fort Sill, Oklahoma
American women academics